Latif Rahman is a Singaporean football midfielder who played for Singapore in the 1984 Asian Cup.

References
Stats

Year of birth missing (living people)
Living people
Singaporean footballers
Singapore international footballers
1984 AFC Asian Cup players
Association football midfielders